Sandy and Johnny is a split album featuring early recordings by Sandy Denny and Johnny Silvo, recorded for Saga Records in 1967. Despite being credited to both singers, the album consists of solo songs by each.

Background
For a time in 1967, Denny was a member of the Johnny Silvo Folk Four, and this album arose from that; however, Allmusic's Richie Unterberger has stated that the "simple folk arrangements ... are often old-fashioned and outmoded".

Track listing

Side one
 Sandy Denny: "Milk and Honey" (Jackson C. Frank)
 Johnny Silvo: "I Wish I Could Shimmy Like My Sister Kate"
 Sandy Denny: "The Last Thing on My Mind" (Tom Paxton)
 Johnny Silvo: "Ol' Man Mose"
 Sandy Denny: "The 3:10 to Yuma" (George Duning, Ned Washington)
 Johnny Silvo: "Black Girl"

Side two
 Sandy Denny: "Make Me a Pallet on Your Floor" (Trad. arr. A. Johnson)
 Johnny Silvo: "Nobody Knows You When You're Down and Out"
 Sandy Denny: "Pretty Polly" (Trad. arr. A. Johnson)
 Johnny Silvo: "Take This Hammer"
 Sandy Denny: "Been on the Road So Long" (Alex Campbell)
 Johnny Silvo: "To Hear My Mother Pray"

Personnel
Sandy Denny - guitar, vocals
Johnny Silvo - guitar, vocals
David Moses - double bass

References

External links
 Mainly Norfolk
 Sandy & Johnny album, sandydenny.co.uk

1967 albums
Sandy Denny albums